Qari Baryal (قاری بریال) is the Taliban military leader and current Governor of Kabul since 7 November 2021. He has also served as Chief of Staff of the 313 Central Corps from 4 October 2021 to 6 December 2021.

References

Year of birth missing (living people)
Living people
Taliban commanders
Afghan military personnel
Taliban governors
Governors of Kabul Province